Michael "Gafacci" Gafatchi is a Ghanaian music producer, disc jockey, and songwriter.

Early life 
Gafacci attended Accra Academy for his senior high school education. He developed his interest for music in High School. In September 2009, Gafacci got introduced to beatmaking by a friend. He has production credits for Dee Moneey, Sarkodie, Chase, D-Black, Ice Prince, Dr Cryme and the others. Gafacci uses Fruity loops, ableton and cubase for all his music production works.

Production career

He produced BET Cypher Ghana 2010 featuring artists like Tinny, Sarkodie, Edem, Kweku T, Reggie Rockstone, and Baby G. He has worked with so many artists in and outside Ghana. He produced/composed and co-wrote Dee-Moneey's hit single "Kpokpo O Body". Gafacci started JOWAA project with French-American Dj Bbrave. Since then he has graced stages as jowaa at ABC Festival (Burkina Faso), Chale Wote Street Art Festival (Ghana), Sabolai Festival (Ghana), Asabaako Festival (Ghana), Nyege Nyege Festival (Uganda), Oslo World Music Festival (Norway) and toured Europe in the fall of 2017.

Production Discography

References

Ghanaian musicians
Living people
Ghanaian record producers
Alumni of the Accra Academy
Year of birth missing (living people)